Notre Dame des Neiges Cemetery is a  rural cemetery located in the borough of Côte-des-Neiges-Notre-Dame-de-Grâce, Montreal, Quebec, Canada which was founded in 1854. The entrance and the grounds run along a part of Côte-des-Neiges Road and up the slopes of Mount Royal. Notre Dame des Neiges Cemetery is the largest cemetery in Canada and the third-largest in North America.

History and description
Created on property purchased from Dr. Pierre Beaubien, the new cemetery was a response to growing demand at a time when the old Saint-Antoine Cemetery (near present-day Dorchester Square) had become too small to serve Montreal's rapidly increasing population. Founded in 1854 as a
garden cemetery in the French style, it was designed by landscape architect Henri-Maurice Perreault, who studied rural cemeteries in Boston and New York. On May 29, 1855, thirty-five-year-old Jane Gilroy McCready, wife of Thomas McCready, then a Montreal municipal councillor, was the first person to be buried in the new cemetery.

Notre Dame des Neiges is the largest cemetery in Canada with more than 55 kilometres of lanes and one million people interred. The Notre Dame des Neiges Cemetery site has more than 65,000 monuments and 71 family vaults.

The cemetery originally served Roman Catholics and rural French Canadians. Italian, Portuguese, Japanese, Orthodox Greek, Polish, Ukrainian and Huron are also represented, indicated in many instances by ethnic motifs on gravestones. The cemetery is adjacent to the Mount Royal Cemetery, a predominantly English-speaking and originally Protestant adjacent burial ground, the Shaar Hashomayim Cemetery, an Ashkenazi Jewish burial ground and Temple Emanu-El Cemetery a Reform Judaism burial ground. These four abutting cemeteries on the slopes of Mount Royal contain a total of 1.5 million burials.

"La Pietà Mausoleum" contains a life-sized marble reproduction of Michelangelo's Pietà sculpture (original located in St. Peter's Basilica at the Vatican). Notre Dame des Neiges Cemetery was designated a National Historic Site of Canada in 1998 and plaqued in 2004.

No burials or cremations took place between May 16, 2007, and September 11, 2007, because of a labour strike. The interments of more than 300 bodies were affected. In addition, its uncut, unkempt grass became a symbol of the labour dispute.

Due to its vast size, locating a specific grave can be difficult. As a result, the cemetery now offers a computerized mapping service that allows visitors to quickly and accurately locate graves. It can be accessed at the cemetery using a touch screen display or via the Internet.

War graves
The only opening in the fence between the Notre Dame des Neiges and Mount Royal cemeteries is where two adjoining military sections are. Shortly after World War I, to emphasize the comradeship and uniformity of sacrifice of Protestant and Catholic soldiers, the Imperial War Graves Commission insisted on an open passage between the two plots and the Cross of Sacrifice was erected.  There are 445 identified Commonwealth service war grave burials commemorated here, 252 from World War I and 215 from World War II. Those whose graves could not be individually marked are named on bronze plaques attached to the Cross of Sacrifice.  The Quebec Memorial on the National Field of Honour at Pointe-Claire lists 24 servicemen buried here, whose graves could no longer be marked or maintained, as alternative commemorations.

New mausoleums
Every mausoleum in Notre Dame des Neiges Cemetery contains multiple crypts, clearly identified, as well as columbaria with glass or marble niches for one or more urns. The first mausoleum, Notre Dame, dedicated to the Blessed Virgin Mary, was built in 1978. The others were added gradually in the years that followed: John-Paul II (1980), Saint-Francis (1982), Marguerite-Bourgeoys (1983), The Pietà (1985), Saints Peter and Paul (1989), Sainte Clare of Assisi (1994), the two-storey Saint Marguerite d’Youville (1996) and most recently, Esther-Blondin (2007).

Opened in November 2007, the Esther Blondin Mausoleum, named after the founder of the Sisters of Saint Anne, houses 6,000 burial crypts and niches.

Notre Dame des Neiges Cemetery

Notable interments

The cemetery is the final resting place for a number of former mayors of the city of Montreal plus other prominent persons including:

 René Angélil (1942–2016), manager, husband of Canadian singer Céline Dion
 William H. Atherton MBE (1867–1950), writer, historian, academic and scholar
 Raoul Barré (1874–1932), cartoonist
 Jean-Louis Beaudry (1809–1886), entrepreneur, politician
 Joseph Béland (1843–1929), politician
 Trefflé Berthiaume (1848–1915), politician
 Bernard Bissonnette (1898–1964), politician
 Richard Blass (1945–1975), criminal
 Charlotte Boisjoli (1923–2001), writer, actress
 Tancrède Boucher de Grosbois (1846–1926), physician and politician
 Henri Bourassa (1868–1952), politician, publisher
 Robert Bourassa (1933–1996), Premier of Quebec
 Pierre Bourgault (1943–2003), politician, intellectual
 Romuald Bourque (1889–1974), businessman and politician
 Arthur Boyer (1851–1922), politician
 François-Philippe Brais (1894–1972), lawyer, politician
 Dino Bravo (1948–1993), WWF wrestler
 Donald Brittain (1928–1989), film director
 Gilles Carle (1928–2009), film director
 Ken Carter (1938–1983), stuntman
 Thérèse Forget Casgrain (1896–1981), feminist, reformer and stateswoman
 Joseph Cattarinich (1881–1938), hockey player and businessman
 Lorne Chabot (1900–1946), NHL ice-hockey goalie
 Joseph-Adolphe Chapleau (1840–1898), lawyer, publisher, politician
 Ernest Cormier (1885–1980), architect
 Vincenzo Cotroni (1911–1984), mobster
 Léo Dandurand (1889–1964), businessman and hockey coach
 Alexandre-Maurice Delisle (1810–1880), businessman, statesman
 Jérémie-Louis Décarie (1870–1927), politician
 Alphonse Desjardins (1854–1920), founder of the Desjardins financial coops
 Bernard Devlin (1824–1880), politician
 General Jacques Dextraze (1919–1993), Chief of Defence Staff Canada 1972–1977
 Jean Drapeau (1916–1999), Mayor of Montreal
 Lewis Thomas Drummond (1813–1882), jurist, politician
 Charles Duquette (1869–1937), mayor of Montreal (1924–1926)
 Ludger Duvernay (1799–1852), founder of Quebec's Société St-Jean-Baptiste
 Edmond Dyonnet (1859–1954), painter
 Pierre Falardeau (1946–2009), film director, screenwriter, writer
 Marcel Faribault (1908–1972), notary and legislative adviser
 Claire Fauteux (1889–1988), painter
 Gérald Fauteux (1900–1980), Chief Justice of Canada
 Amédée-Emmanuel Forget (1847–1923), Lieutenant-Governor of the Northwest Territories and Saskatchewan
 Louis-Joseph Forget (1853–1911), financier and president of the Montreal Stock Exchange.
 Sir Rodolphe Forget (1861–1919), financier, statesman, president of the Montreal Stock Exchange.
 Joseph-Achille Francoeur (1882–1959), politician
 Clarence Gagnon (1881–1942), painter, engraver, illustrator
 Jean Gascon (1921–1988), stage and film actor/director
 Roger Gaudry (1913–2001), chemist, businessman, and rector of the Université de Montréal
 Conrad Gauthier (1886–1964), singer/songwriter
 Joseph Gauthier (1877–1934), politician
 Gratien Gélinas (1904–1999), actor, author, playwright
 Sir Lomer Gouin, (1861–1929), Lieutenant-Governor and Premier of Quebec
 Robert Gravel (1945–1996), actor
 Joseph Guibord (1809–1869), patriot, buried through a court order in the Guibord case
 Doug Harvey (1924–1989), ice-hockey Hall of Fame defenceman
 Louis-Philippe Hébert (1850–1917), sculptor
 Camillien Houde (1889–1958), statesman, Mayor of Montreal
 Harry Hyland (1889–1969), Hall of Fame ice-hockey player
 Henri Julien (1852–1908), lithographer, painter, illustrator, caricaturist, reporter
 Charles Laberge (1827–1874), journalist and politician
 Eugène Lafontaine (1857–1935), politician
 Sir Louis-Hippolyte Lafontaine (1807–1864), jurist, politician
 Alfred Laliberté (1878–1953), sculptor
 Pierre Laporte (1921–1970), statesman assassinated by FLQ terrorists
 Calixa Lavallée (1842–1891), composer of "O Canada"
 René Lecavalier (1918–1999), sports commentator
 Marc Lépine (1964–1989), mass murderer
 J. Louis Lévesque (1911–1994) stockbroker, philanthropist, horse racing builder
 Jean-Claude Malépart (1938–1989), politician
 Joséphine Marchand (1861–1925), journalist and women's rights activist
 Nick Auf der Maur (1942–1998), journalist, politician
 André Mathieu (1929–1968), composer
 Charles Mayer (1901–1971),  journalist, sportsperson and politician
 John Wait McGauvran (1827–1884), businessman and politician
 Thomas D'Arcy McGee (1825–1868), journalist, statesman, Father of Confederation
 Honoré Mercier (1840–1894), statesman
 Arthur Mignault (1865–1937), pharmaceutical entrepreneur, colonel of the RCAMC, founder of the Royal 22e Régiment
 Pierre-Basile Mignault (1878–1929) Puisne Justice Supreme Court of Canada
 Jos Montferrand (1802–1864), strong man
 Denise Morelle (1926–1984), actress
 Pierre Nadeau (1936–2019), Canadian journalist, television presenter and producer
 Émile Nelligan (1879–1941), poet
 Robert Nelson (1794–1873), medical practitioner, statesman
 John Ostell (1813–1892), architect
 Gédéon Ouimet (1823–1905), lawyer, politician, Premier of the Province of Quebec
 Philippe Panneton (1895–1960), writer, physician, diplomat
 Denis-Émery Papineau (1819–1899), politician
 Jean Papineau-Couture (1916–2000), composer
 Alice Poznanska-Parizeau (1930–1990), writer
 Damase Parizeau (1841–1915), politician
 Lise Payette (1931–2018), politician
 Pierre Péladeau (1925–1997), businessman, media mogul
 Denise Pelletier (1923–1976), actress
 Narcisse Pérodeau (1851–1932), lawyer, law professor, politician, Lieutenant-Governor of the Province of Quebec
 Maurice Perrault (1857–1909), architect and politician
 Maurice Richard (1921–2000), Hall of Fame ice-hockey player
 Jean-Paul Riopelle (1923–2002), painter and sculptor
 Yvon Robert, (1914–1971), professional wrestler
 Jean "Johnny" Rougeau (1929–1983), professional wrestler
 Jeanne Sauvé (1922–1993), politician and Governor-General of Canada
 Idola Saint-Jean (1875–1945), journalist and women's rights advocate
 Lhasa de Sela (1972–2010), singer-songwriter
 Lord Thomas George Shaughnessy (1853–1923), President of CPR
 Henri-Thomas Taschereau Chief justice of Quebec (1907–1909), journalist, politician, and judge; b. 6 October 1841
 Louis-Olivier Taillon (1840–1923), Quebec Premier (1892–1896)
 Mary Travers, "La Bolduc" (1894–1941), singer
 Paolo Violi (1931–1978), mobster
 Charles Wilson (1808–1877), businessman, mayor of Montreal
 Joseph-Marcellin Wilson (1859–1940), financier, philanthropist, statesman

See also
 Mount Royal Park

References

External links

 Official website
 Official website 
 
 
  

Cemeteries in Montreal
Roman Catholic cemeteries in Canada
Mount Royal
National Historic Sites in Quebec
Côte-des-Neiges–Notre-Dame-de-Grâce
Rural cemeteries
Commonwealth War Graves Commission cemeteries in Canada